The MIT Group of Institutions is a nonprofit group of educational institutions operated by the Maharashtra Academy of Engineering and Educational Research.

It is not related to the much more recognised Massachusetts Institute of Technology (MIT) located in the United States.

Universities
It operates a number of universities and schools including:
 MIT World Peace University (MIT-WPU)
 MIT Art, Design and Technology University (MIT-ADT)
 Avantika University
 Maharashtra Institute of Medical Education and Research
 MIT University, Meghalaya

As of 2019, its three flagship design and engineering schools generated more than 50% of its revenues. They are:
 the MIT Institute of Design, part of MIT-ADT
 MIT Pune, part of MIT-WPU
 MIT College of Engineering, part of MIT-WPU

MAEER INSTITUTES

References

External links 
 

Non-profit organisations based in India
Universities in India